Ann Banfield, is a professor Emeritus of English at the University of California, Berkeley.

Banfield has taught at Berkeley since 1975 and is a specialist in linguistics, critical theory and the use of philosophy as a cornerstone of modernism. In the field of narratology, Banfield has been given lasting credit for her concepts of narratorless subjectivity and addresseelessness in narration.

Works

Awards
 1982 Guggenheim Fellowship

Sources

Living people
Year of birth missing (living people)
American academics of English literature
University of California, Berkeley College of Letters and Science faculty
Place of birth missing (living people)